Uhligia may refer to:
Uhligia (beetle), a genus of beetles in the family Mordellidae
Uhligia (ammonite), a genus of cephalopods in the family Ancyloceratidae